"Prophecy" is a song by rock band Remy Zero. Taken from their album Villa Elaine, it charted on both the United States Billboard Modern Rock Tracks chart and Mainstream Rock Tracks chart. The song was featured in the movies She's All That and The Last Kiss. The song featured in Charmed Episode #1.3 "Thank You For Not Morphing".

Music video
The "Prophecy" music video showcases the band performing the song live.

Promo CD track listing
 "Prophecy" - 3:24

Chart performance

External links

Prophecy Music Video

1998 singles
1998 songs
Geffen Records singles

pt:Save Me (canção de Remy Zero)